Agnese Udinotti (born 1940) is a Greek-born American poet, sculptor, writer, and painter.

Born in Athens, Udinotti earned both her bachelor's and master's degree, in 1962 and 1963 respectively, from Arizona State University. Her work has appeared in many solo and group exhibitions, both in the United States and abroad, and she has received a number of honors and awards. She was for a time poetry editor of the magazine Chimera. Museums which own examples of her art include the Phoenix Art Museum, the National Gallery of Athens, the Vorres Museum, the Glendale Community College Sculpture Garden and the National Museum of Women in the Arts; her work is also in numerous private and corporate collections, and she has produced sculpture for the General Services Administration. Udinotti is the founder of the Udinotti Museum of Figurative Art in Arizona.

Udinotti is the author of Udinotti, a collection of her writings illustrated with photographs of her sculpture.

Early life

Udinotti was born on January 9, 1940, in Greece. Her father was executed by the Communists after World War II, when Udinotti was only four years old. The Communists arrested her father, who they suspected of working against their interests, and executed him alongside 2,000 prisoners, during the Dekemvriana events, outside of Athens. This tragedy would later affect Udinotti's work, such as her commemorative series called "Monument to My Father." Barely a teenager when she left for the United States, where she enrolled at Arizona State University.

Works

Udinotti has stated that her father has been the leading inspiration for her art and in making herself successful. In 1987, she began working on the series called "Monument to My Father," which was her first three-dimensional work. This consists of oil paints and plaster with her written poetry on stelae.

Then she began "Shadow Images", which was a commemorative piece after for her mother's death. This consists of graphite with the use of negative space.

In 2000, Udinotti began founding the Udinotti Museum of Figurative Art, a personally-funded and private organization. She was dedicated to educating and sharing with the public the ancient messages of art. She then worked towards curating the artworks and planning the construction of the museum. It officially opened in November 2007.

References

1940 births
Living people
Arizona State University alumni
Greek people of Italian descent
Greek emigrants to the United States
Artists from Arizona
Sculptors from Arizona
Writers from Arizona
20th-century American poets
20th-century American painters
20th-century American sculptors
20th-century American women writers
20th-century American women artists
21st-century American poets
21st-century American painters
21st-century American sculptors
21st-century American women writers
21st-century American women artists